The Bogachiel River is a river of the Olympic Peninsula in the U.S. state of Washington. It originates near Bogachiel Peak, flows west through the mountains of Olympic National Park. After emerging from the park it joins the Sol Duc River, forming the Quillayute River, which empties into the Pacific Ocean near La Push, Washington.

The Quillayute River system, with its main tributaries of the Bogachiel, Sol Duc, Calawah, and Dickey Rivers, drains the largest watershed on the north Olympic Peninsula.

The name "Bogachiel" is a corruption of the Quileute words bo qwa tcheel el, or /boqʷač'íʔl/, from /bó:q'ʷa/, "muddy", and /číʔlowa/, "water", meaning "gets riley [turbid] after a rain", "muddy waters", or, less likely, "big river".

Course
The Bogachiel River begins in several headwater streams near Bogachiel Peak in the Olympic Wilderness of Olympic National Park, in the northwest part of the Olympic Peninsula. Flowing west through a deep valley just north of the Hoh River valley, it gathers various mountain streams, including one of its main tributaries, the North Fork Bogachiel River.

Below the North Fork confluence, the Bogachiel River flows along the boundary between Clallam County and Jefferson County, crossing and recrossing the line many times. After gathering many more tributary streams, such as Tunwata Creek and Hades Creek, it leaves Olympic National Park. Skirting the edge of the Olympic National Forest, the river turns northwest, passing through Bogachiel State Park. U.S. Highway 101 follows the river for several miles. Just west of the city of Forks the Calawah River joins the Bogachiel. Forks is situated between the two rivers and takes its name from the forking streams.

Below the Calawah confluence the Bogachiel River widens considerably and takes a meandering course westward through a broad valley. The Sol Duc River enters this valley from the north, and the two streams meander alongside one another for several miles before joining. The Quillayute River, formed by the confluence, flows west for only about six miles more before reaching the Pacific Ocean at La Push. In its lower reach the Quillayute River enters the coastal wilderness of Olympic National Park. The mouth of the Quillayute is contained within the Quileute Indian Reservation.

Natural history

The upper Bogachiel River valley contains temperate rain forests, similar to the Hoh Rain Forest of the Hoh River valley.

Recreation
A large portion of the Bogachiel River is in the wilderness of Olympic National Park. The Bogachiel Trail, beginning a few miles outside the park, follows the Bogachiel River to the North Fork Bogachiel, then follows that river valley up into the high mountains, connecting to other trails that lead north to the Sol Duc River valley and south to the Hoh River valley.

The Bogachiel River, along with the Quillayute's other tributaries, are popular for fishing. The rivers hosts healthy stocks of wild winter steelhead (the anadromous form of coastal rainbow trout) with as many as 19,000 fish returning in some years and up to 50,000 hatchery raised steelhead. The river also supports large runs of Chinook and coho salmon and holds resident populations of coastal cutthroat trout and Dolly Varden.

Unlike many other large rivers of the Olympic Peninsula, the headwaters of the Bogachiel and the other Quillayute tributaries are not glacier-fed. As a result, they do not experience a spring and summer flood pulse with heavy sediment loads. This gives the Bogachiel River a longer fishing season.

See also
List of Washington rivers

References

External links
 Bogachiel River Trail, National Park Service
 Bogachiel State Park, Washington State Parks

Rivers of Washington (state)
Rivers of Clallam County, Washington
Rivers of Jefferson County, Washington
Washington placenames of Native American origin